Kelvin Okafor  (born 1 November 1985) is a British hyperrealist artist who specialises in pencil portraits.

Early life and education 

Okafor is of Nigerian descent. He grew up in Tottenham, London. He was educated at St Ignatius' College in Enfield, where at the age of 15 he began to hone his talent for drawing.

Okafor undertook a Foundation Art & Design course at City and Guilds Art School (2005–06), and went on to study at Middlesex University (2006–09), graduating with a BA degree in Fine Art. Awards he has won include the Catherine Petitgas Visitors Choice Prize, part of the National Open Art Competition.

Career 

Okafor can confidently work with sculpture, glass, printmaking, painting and casting. He specialises in hyper-realistic portrait drawings of ordinary people and celebrities. His work is often mistaken for photographs due to their detail and likeness to reality. Early pieces includes portraits of Amy Winehouse, Mother Teresa, Lauryn Hill, Jamal, Nelson Mandela, Beyoncé, Daniel Craig, Corinne Bailey Rae, Rihanna and Tinie Tempah. In 2017, Okafor became the first black artist to be permanently exhibited in the House of Commons with his pencil portrait of Bernie Grant.

The style in which Okafor creates his portraits is known as Hyperrealism. Art Critic, Estelle Lovatt describes his work as 'Emotional Realism'. She mentions how the work of Okafor goes beyond being just 'Photorealist' drawings, and instead coins the term Emotional Realism to describe the affective nature of his artwork.

Recent work

More recently, Okafor's celebrity work has included a portrait of the late musician John Lennon, which was an integral part of his 2019 Exhibition Retrospective where he unveiled the portrait to the general public. This exhibition showcased some of Okafor's work during a 10-year period. Furthermore, in early 2020, Okafor unveiled his portrait of model Winnie Harlow in support of her charity for vitiligo.

In early 2020, during the COVID-19 pandemic, Okafor released a portrait of the late musician Prince. The original reference photo he used for this piece was transformed by his choice to open Prince's eyes in the portrait, something he had never done before.

In late 2020 Okafor also featured on Sky's Portrait Artist of the Year where his muse in the competition, Fred Sirieix, selected Okafor's work to keep. 

Okafor also continues to develop his personal portfolio in addition to his private commissions and celebrity work.

Solo exhibitions 

 Portraits, 49 Albemarle Street, London, May 2014
 Interludes, 49 Albemarle Street, London, September–October 2016
 Retrospective, Mall Galleries, London, September 2019
 Kelvin Okafor x W1 Curates, on the shop-front of Flannels store, Oxford Street, London, July 2020, in association with W1 Curates. Included portraits of black people such as Nelson Mandela, Obama, Mike Tyson and Beyonce. Okafor exhibited again with W1 Curates in February 2021, this time dedicated to his portrait of Skepta.

References

External links
 

Living people
English people of Nigerian descent
Black British artists
Alumni of Middlesex University
People educated at St Ignatius' College, Enfield
British artists
1985 births